The Samsung Galaxy M51 is a mid-range Android smartphone manufactured by Samsung Electronics as part of their M series. It was announced in late August 2020 and released the following month. The phone has a 6.7 in sAMOLED Plus display, a 64 MP quad-camera setup, and a 7000 mAh battery. It is primarily derived from the Samsung Galaxy A71 in terms of design and specifications.

Specifications

Hardware
The Samsung Galaxy M51 has a sAMOLED Plus Infinity-O Display with a 1080 x 2400 resolution, a 20:9 aspect ratio, and a pixel density of ~385 ppi. The phone comes with 128 GB of internal storage, as well as either 6 or 8GB of RAM. The storage can be expanded via microSD. The phone is powered by the Qualcomm SDM730 Snapdragon 730G (8 nm) paired with the Adreno 618 GPU.

Battery 
The Samsung Galaxy M51 has a non-removable lithium polymer with a 7000 mAh capacity. This is the highest battery capacity of any Samsung Galaxy phone as of September 2020, and significantly higher than most other widely available phones.

Cameras
The Samsung Galaxy M51 has a quad-camera setup arranged in an "L" shape on the top left corner of the back plastic. The camera setup consists of a 64 MP wide-angle camera, capable of 4K video recording, a 12 MP ultrawide camera, a 5 MP depth camera for close-up shots, and a 5 MP depth sensor for Live Focus. A single 32 MP front-facing camera is tucked into the punch-hole in the top center of the display.

Software
The Samsung Galaxy M51 comes with Android 10 with Samsung's signature One UI "CORE" 2.1. In late 2021,  Samsung announced that Samsung Galaxy M51 will receive Android 12 updates based on One UI 4.1.

History 
The Samsung Galaxy M51 was announced on August 31, 2020. It was released the following month on September 11, 2020.

See also 
 Samsung Galaxy M series
 Samsung Galaxy

References 

Samsung Galaxy
Mobile phones introduced in 2020
Android (operating system) devices
Samsung mobile phones
Phablets
Mobile phones with multiple rear cameras
Mobile phones with 4K video recording